Valley coal mine, commonly known as Valley Colliery, was a coal mine located in Hednesford, Staffordshire, UK on which today is the site of the Museum of Cannock Chase.  The currently standing museum is housed in some of the buildings remaining from the Valley Colliery. Valley coal mine was a popular coal mine and a training centre until the 1950s..

Valley was just one of many major coal mines dotted about the Hednesford Hills, but Cannock Chase also contained many smaller coal mines.

References

External links
 Museum Website
 Timeline of coal mining on Cannock Chase

Coal mines in Staffordshire
Cannock Chase
Hednesford